Sumniboma is a village in the East Mamprusi District, a district in.the Northern Region of north Ghana. Edward Mahama, leader of the People's National Convention was born in Sumniboma.

References 

Populated places in the Northern Region (Ghana)